Altagonum exutum is a species of ground beetle in the subfamily Carabinae. It was described by Darlington in 1971.

References

exutum
Beetles described in 1971